Haws is a surname. Notable people with the surname include:

 John Henry Hobart Haws (1809-1858), United States Representative from New York
 Kurt Haws (born 1969), former American football tight end
 Larry Haws (1940–2012), U.S. politician from Minnesota
 Tyler Haws (born 1991), American basketball player

See also
 Haw (disambiguation)
 Hawes (disambiguation)